The Crystal River Energy Complex consists of seven power-generating plants on a  site near the mouth of the Crystal River in Citrus County, Florida.  Crystal River 1, 2, 4, and 5 are fossil fuel power plants. Crystal River 3 was previously the sole nuclear power plant on the site (1977-2013). The Crystal River Combined Cycle site consists of two Mitsubishi gas turbines, which came on-line in 2018.  The complex was developed in the early 1960s by the Florida Power Corporation and sold to Progress Energy Inc in 2000. Following Progress Energy's merger with Duke Energy in 2012, the facility is owned and operated by Duke Energy.

In February 2013, Duke Energy announced that Crystal River 3 would be permanently shut down.

Power plants

See also 

Levy County Nuclear Power Plant
Progress Energy Inc
List of power stations in Florida

References

External links
The Crystal River Energy Complex  
100 Largest Electric Plants
St. Petersburg Times: Second nuclear plant won't come without risks
 Data on generation and fuel consumption from the Energy Information Administration Electricity Data Browser

Buildings and structures in Citrus County, Florida
Coal-fired power stations in Florida
Nuclear power plants in Florida
1966 establishments in Florida
Energy infrastructure completed in 1966